The 1868 United States presidential election in Nevada took place on November 3, 1868, as part of the 1868 United States presidential election. Nevada voters chose three representatives, or electors, to the Electoral College, who voted for president and vice president.

Nevada was won by Ulysses S. Grant, formerly the 6th Commanding General of the United States Army (R-Illinois), running with Speaker of the House Schuyler Colfax, with 55.39% of the popular vote, against the 18th governor of New York, Horatio Seymour (D–New York), running with former Senator Francis Preston Blair, Jr., with 44.61% of the vote.

Results

See also
United States presidential elections in Nevada

References

Nevada
1868
1868 Nevada elections